The 2021–22 season is the 47th season in the existence of NK Hrvatski Dragovoljac and the club's first season back in the top flight of Croatian football since 2014. In addition to the domestic league, Hrvatski Dragovoljac will participate in this season's edition of the Croatian Cup.

Players

First-team squad

Other players under contract

Transfers

Pre-season and friendlies

Competitions

Overall record

Prva HNL

League table

Results summary

Results by round

Matches
The league fixtures were announced on 8 June 2021.

Croatian Cup

References

NK Hrvatski Dragovoljac seasons
Hrvatski Dragovoljac